Bouguerra Soltani (also Abu Jerra Sultani and other spellings) (born in 1954 in Tébessa Province) was the leader of the Algerian party Mouvement de la Societé pour la Paix (Movement of the Society for Peace, abbreviated MSP or Hamas), which is reformist-Islamist and considered close to the doctrine of the Muslim Brotherhood.

References

1954 births
Living people
People from Tébessa Province
Algerian democracy activists
Islamic democracy activists
Movement of Society for Peace politicians
21st-century Algerian people